Helluva Boss is an American adult animated web series created by Vivienne "VivziePop" Medrano. It revolves around the misadventures of the employees of I.M.P., an assassination company in Hell. The pilot was released on November 25, 2019, while the first episode of the first season was released on October 31, 2020. The show is produced by SpindleHorse Toons. The first season was released exclusively to Medrano's YouTube channel, as she has done for other animations. On November 13, 2021, the show was confirmed to be renewed for a second season, which premiered on July 30, 2022.

Premise
The series follows the employees of I.M.P. (Immediate Murder Professionals), an imp-run assassination company in Hell, on their many different jobs. The members of I.M.P. include Blitzo (pronounced "Blitz"), the boss of the venture, along with weapons specialist Moxxie, powerhouse Millie, and receptionist hellhound Loona. With the help of an ancient book obtained from Stolas, a Goetial demon of Hell, they access the human world to complete their tasks on order from demons in Hell.

The show features a different cast of characters and a different storyline than Hazbin Hotel, another show created by Medrano, despite taking place within the same universe. As Medrano described it, while both shows share the same setting, Helluva Boss follows "characters and societies that already exist in Hell", with the main focus being on interpersonal relationships between characters, while Hazbin Hotel is about redemption and consequences.

Voice cast

Main
Brandon Rogers as Blitzo
Richard Horvitz as Moxxie
Vivian Nixon as Millie
Erica Lindbeck as Loona
Bryce Pinkham as Stolas

Guest voices

Mara Wilson as Mrs. Mayberry, additional voices
Jinkx Monsoon as Martha, additional voices
Maxwell Atoms as Ralphie, additional voices
Barrett Wilbert Weed as Octavia
Alex Brightman as Robo Fizz, Fizzarolli
Cristina Vee as Verosika Mayday
James Monroe Iglehart as Vortex, Asmodeus
Vivienne Medrano as Keenie, Deerie, additional voices
Norman Reedus as Striker
Erica Luttrell as Agent 2
Jonathan Freeman as Paimon and Cash Buckzo
Eric Schwartz as Chazwick Thurman

Episodes

Pilot (2019)

Season 1 (2020-21)

Season 2 (2022–present)

Production and release
In June 2019, Medrano stated that she was working with Erica Lindbeck, Brock Baker, and Brandon Rogers on a "new project." In August of the same year, she posted illustrations of the main cast of characters. The pilot was cast by voice actor Kellen Goff and voice directed by Medrano and Rick Zieff. The company Horseless Cowboy assisted Medrano with voice work during the first season, with Richard Horvitz and Medrano voice directing. Lucas Bermudez of Screen Rant attributed the success of Hazbin Hotel as the sole reason for Helluva Boss being greenlit. At some point, Rogers asked Jinkx Monsoon to voice a character in Helluva Boss, but Monsoon wanted to voice "stock characters" instead, so they did so, voicing various background and one-off characters in the show's first season.

On November 25, 2019, the pilot was released on Medrano's YouTube channel. Medrano contributed her writing and animation skills for this episode. Writing production for more episodes began in December 2019, with 8 episodes ordered.

In June 2020, Medrano stated her intent to feature more black characters in Helluva Boss and Hazbin Hotel in a tweet where she called on black animators to share their work with her to potentially be hired to work on the series. In August 2020, the recording for the first eight episodes of season 1 was completed, and Lucas Bermudez of Screen Rant predicted that more episodes of Helluva Boss would be released to YouTube "as a web series" because of the COVID-19 pandemic.

On October 31, 2020, the first episode of season 1 was released. In the episode, Rogers and Horvitz return as Blitzo and Moxxie, and while Lindbeck returns as Loona, she is replaced by Vivian Nixon as the voice of Millie. Baker was replaced by Bryce Pinkham as Stolas. Guest stars of the episode include Monsoon, Mara Wilson, and Maxwell Atoms. The same day, Jefferson Friedman released a single from the soundtrack of the first episode, entitled "Stolas Speaks." Medrano has shared several teasers for the show on her Instagram and Twitter accounts throughout the show's production.

On January 31, 2021, the third episode of the series was age-restricted by YouTube. In response, entertainment site Newgrounds offered to host an uncensored version of the episode and promote it with "a front page banner," something which Medrano expressed interest in. The episode's age restriction was lifted the next day.

In February 2021, Medrano told Insider that Helluva Boss remains independent of Hazbin Hotel, stating she intends to keep it that way "as long as the audience wants to keep seeing it", adding that she has "a plan for where the story goes and ends."

In February 2022, the official Helluva Boss Twitter account stated that the season one finale would be out "soon" but that it was taking longer than expected, and noted that season two was in production.

On June 3, 2022, the Helluva Boss Twitter account released an update after what was originally intended to be the final episode of season 1 was delayed. The update announced that the series would instead be moving forward with season 2 on July 30, 2022, making "OZZIE'S" the season 1 finale retroactively. The original season 1 finale will instead be released at an unknown later date as a standalone special.

LGBTQ+ representation

Helluva Boss has various LGBTQ+ characters, specifically a bisexual demon named Moxxie, and a pansexual demon named Blitzo. Another demon named Stolas is queer due to his relations with both men and women. Medrano also reacted positively to a fan idea of a sitcom set in an alternative universe where Blitzo and Stolas are "two single dads getting married". The episode "The Harvest Moon Festival" introduced the character Sallie May, Millie's sister, who was confirmed on the show's official Twitter account to be transgender.

Reception
Helluva Boss was met with critical acclaim, garnering universal praise for its animation, characters, voice acting, songs, and humor. In December 2019, in an article about the current state of adult animation, CBR animation critic Reuben Baron stated that while the pilot episode of Helluva Boss has garnered "warranted criticism" because of its "edgy" humor, it is still a "clear labor of love from an animation standpoint." Tito W. James's assessment on Comicon.com stated that demons having access to a portal that connects to the human realm "adds a new dynamic and is ripe for narrative potential." Similarly, a reviewer for the Spanish site Cafetoons praised the characters for being introduced in a "very appropriate way" while maintaining the adult comedy and catchy songs. Other animators praised the show's first episode. Margaret Troup of the Iowa State Daily stated that there are "multiple musical numbers in each episode", similar to Animaniacs and Family Guy, and although the second episode was more serious than previous episodes, there were still plenty of "laughs and raunchy jokes". The same was said about the show's third episode, which one reviewer said had other types of humor like "fourth-wall breaking and blink-and-you-miss-it sight-gags".

Awards and nominations

Notes

References

External links

American adult animated web series
2020s black comedy television series
2020s American LGBT-related comedy television series
2020s American musical comedy television series
2020 web series debuts
Anime-influenced Western animated television series
American adult animated comedy television series
American adult animated musical television series
Adult comedy web series
Fiction about the afterlife
Hell in popular culture
Demons in television
Independent animation
American comedy webcomics
Adultery in television
LGBT-related animated web series
English-language television shows
Television series about demons
2020s YouTube series
Hazbin Hotel